P. N. Vinayachandran is a Professor of Oceanography at the Centre for Atmospheric and Oceanic Sciences (CAOS), Indian Institute of Science, Bangalore, India. He is the recipient of the 2008 Shanti Swarup Bhatnagar Award.

Biography
P. N. Vinayachandran hails from the state of Kerala. He  obtained his  M.Sc. (Engg.) in Oceanography from  the Indian Institute of Science and Doctorate in Oceanography in 1996 from Indian Institute of Science, Bangalore. Having done Post-doctoral research in the University of Tokyo he continued in Japan to work as a Senior Researcher at the Frontier System for Global Change, JAMSTEC. In 1999, he returned to India to join as a member of Faculty at the Center for Atmospheric and Oceanic Sciences, Indian Institute of Science, Bengaluru India, where he is currently a professor of oceanography.

References

External links
Homepage of P. N. Vinayachandran
 Vinayachandran's list of publications

1964 births
Living people
Indian Institute of Science alumni
Academic staff of the Indian Institute of Science
Scientists from Thrissur
Indian oceanographers
People from Thrissur district
20th-century Indian earth scientists
Recipients of the Shanti Swarup Bhatnagar Award in Earth, Atmosphere, Ocean & Planetary Sciences